Bada Gaon Jain temple is a Jain temple in Bada Gaon, Baghpat, Uttar Pradesh.

Location
Bada Gaon Jain temple is situated in Khekra in "Parshvanatha Atishaya Kshetra", Bada Gaon, Uttar Pradesh.

Shri Parshwanath Atishaya Kshetra Prachin Digambar Jain Mandir
This centuries old temple is dedicated to Parshvanatha, the 23rd tirthankar.
Moolnayak of this temple is a white marble idol of Parshvanatha which was recovered from a well inside the temple. The idol is considered miraculous as well as water of the well is believed to have curative powers. Apart from the main idol, several other idols were also discovered during excavation which have also been installed in separate altars.

See also

Prachin Digambar Jain Mandir
Trilok Teerth Dham
Bada Gaon

References

Jain temples in Uttar Pradesh
Bagpat district
20th-century Jain temples
20th-century architecture in India